Médée is a dramatic tragedy in five acts written in alexandrine verse by Pierre Corneille in 1635.

Summary 

The heroine of the play is the sorceress Médée.  After Médée gives Jason twin boys, Jason leaves her for Creusa. Médée exacts her revenge on her husband by burning his new spouse and slitting the throats of her two children.  The final act of the play ends with Médée's escape in a chariot pulled by two dragons, and Jason's suicide.

Médée (1635) in Pierre Corneille's career 

Médée was Corneille's first tragedy.  This tragedy was performed for the first time in 1635 by the Marais troupe, the rival of the hôtel de Bourgogne. During its installation at the Théâtre du Marais, the play's reception was lukewarm.  Furthermore, the performances of Médée followed Corneille's expulsion from the prestigious group of five authors.  The playwright no longer had the protection of Richelieu, who, resentful, greeted Corneille's first tragedy with disapproval. Médée was published in 1639,  four years after it was first performed.

Seneca : both example and source of inspiration for Corneille 

Corneille, inspired by the play by Seneca and by the play by Euripides, also brought numerous personal modifications to his interpretations.

1635 plays
Adaptations of works by Seneca the Younger
Plays based on ancient Greek and Roman plays
Plays based on Medea (Euripides play)
Plays by Pierre Corneille
Tragedy plays